La Jamais Contente was the first road vehicle to go over . It was a Belgian electric vehicle with a light-alloy torpedo-shaped bodywork and batteries. The high position of the driver and the exposed chassis underneath spoiled much of the aerodynamics. The light alloy, called partinium, is a mixture of aluminium, tungsten and magnesium. 

The land speed record was established on 29 April or 1 May 1899 at Achères, Yvelines near Paris, France.  The vehicle had two Postel-Vinay 25 kW motors, each driving the rear axle via a chain, running at 200 V and drawing 124 A each, for about 68 hp total, and was equipped with Michelin tires. The chassis was number 25.

Driver 
The vehicle was driven by the Belgian driver Camille Jenatzy. Camille was the son of Constant Jenatzy, a manufacturer of rubber products (rubber was still a novelty at the time). Camille had studied as an engineer, with an interest in electric-traction automobiles. He became known for his record-breaking speed runs and was nicknamed  ("The Red Devil") for the colour of his beard. He died in 1913, after being shot in a hunting accident.

Motivation 
Wishing to carve a place in the then promising Parisian electric carriage market, Jenatzy started a manufacturing plant, which would produce many electric carriages and trucks.  He competed fiercely against the carriage-maker Jeantaud in publicity stunts to see which of them made the fastest vehicles.  In order to ensure the triumph of his company, Jenatzy built a bullet-shaped prototype, conceived by the carriage-maker Rothschild in partinium (an alloy of laminated aluminum, tungsten and magnesium).

Speed record 
After this exploit the gasoline-fuelled combustion engine would increasingly supplant electric technology for the next century.

The Jamais Contente is now on display at the automobile museum in Compiègne, France.

See also 
 Land speed record
 Other land speed record electric automobiles
 Buckeye Bullet (2004)
 Keio University Eliica (2004)
 Venturi Jamais Contente (2010)

References

External links 

  National car and tourism museum in Compiègne

Electric land speed record cars
Electric vehicles introduced in the 20th century
Belgian inventions